Brandon Ogles is an American politician who serves in the Tennessee House of Representatives. A Republican, he represents district 61, which is located in northern Williamson County, and includes the city of Brentwood and part of Franklin.

Biography
Ogles moved to the Williamson County area when he was eight years old. He is an Eagle Scout. Ogles graduated from Franklin High School in 1995. He received a Bachelor of Science in Management with a minor in Finance from Lipscomb University. He is the owner of Branch Building Group.

Ogles first announced his candidacy on November 8, 2017, after then-incumbent Charlest Sargent chose not to run for reelection.

He serves on the Judiciary Committee, Criminal Justice Subcommittee, Finance, Ways, & Means Committee, Finance, Ways, & Means Subcommittee, and the Joint Pensions and Insurance Committee. He is the Majority Caucus Vice Chairman.

Personal life
Ogles is a Southern Baptist.

References

21st-century American politicians
People from Brentwood, Tennessee
Year of birth missing (living people)
Living people
Republican Party members of the Tennessee House of Representatives